Mount John Laurie is a mountain in the Canadian Rockies, located in Alberta's Municipal District of Bighorn No. 8.

Various names 
Officially named Mount John Laurie in 1961, it is also known as Mount Laurie, or by the Nakoda name Mount Yamnuska, or simply Yamnuska.  Yamnuska translates to "wall of stone" and is derived from the Stoney Nakoda word  that describes steep cliffs or "the flat faced mountain."

John Lee Laurie, 1899–1959, was a founder of the Indian Association of Alberta. The mountain's 1961 renaming came at the request of the Stoney Nakoda First Nation. Laurie, an educator and political activist, served as secretary of the Indian Association of Alberta from 1944 to 1956, promoting the causes of First Nations in Alberta.

Peak and climbing 
Located close to Calgary, it is a popular "great scramble". It is also a popular rock climbing destination, with over 100 routes of all difficulty levels spread out across its face.

Geology 
Mount John Laurie is the result of the McConnell Thrust Fault, which put the resistive, cliff-forming Cambrian carbonate rock of the Eldon Formation on top of the much younger and weaker Cretaceous aged, clastic Belly River Formation The fault, which sits at the base of the cliff face, represents an age difference of around 450 million years.

Spirituality
In 1987 Mount John Laurie was listed into a global network of natural spiritual places, which also included Mount Fuji in Japan, Stonehenge, Mount Shasta, Machu Picchu in Peru, Australia's Uluru, and the pyramids of the Yucatán.

References

External links

John Laurie
Alberta's Rockies